Khalana  is a village in Kendujhar district in the Indian state of Odisha.

Geography 
It is situated 3 kilometres from NH 20 and 12 kilometres from Anandapur and 95 kilometres from Kendujhar.
Khalana is a panchayat village within Ghasipura Block of Anandapur Subdivision.

Nearby villages are Sainkul, Agarda Lunahara, Nuagaon and Suanpada.

Economy 
The primary occupation is agriculture. Business is the fastest growing area. Younger people are migrating to find better jobs. A few provide government services as teachers, chartered accountants and scientists.

Administration 
Khalana Village is administrated by Khalana Gram panchayat. Khalana gram panchayat includes two villages; Agarda and Khalana
Khalana Village has been divided into some Sahi's They are

Chhotipada Sahi (୧.ଛୋଟିପଡା ସାହି)
Bandha Sahi (୨.ବନ୍ଧ ସାହି)
Matihudi Sahi (୩.ମାଟିହୁଡ଼ି ସାହି)
Balidanda Sahi (୪.ବାଲିଦାଣ୍ଡ ସାହି)
Patana Sahi (୫.ପାଟଣା ସାହି)
Majhi Sahi (୬.ମାଝି ସାହି)
Gouda Sahi (୭.ଗଉଡ଼ ସାହି)
Behera Sahi (୮.ବେହେରା ସାହି)
Majhi Sahi (୯.ମଝି ସାହି)
Gadia Sahi (୧୦.ଗଡ଼ିଆ ସାହି)
Tala Sahi (୧୧.ତଳ ସାହି)

Education  
Khalana Village has two primary schools and one high school to improve its education. The schools are

 Khalana UGUP School (ଖଲଣା ମଧ୍ୟ ଇଂରାଜୀ ବିଦ୍ୟାଳୟ)
 Tala Sahi Primary School (ତଳସାହି ପ୍ରାଥମିକ ବିଦ୍ୟାଳୟ,ଖଲଣା.)
 Thakurani Bidyapitha, Khalana (ଠାକୁରାଣୀ ବିଦ୍ୟାପୀଠ,ଖଲଣା).
 Saraswati Shisu Mandira (ସରସ୍ୱତୀ ଶିଶୁ ବିଦ୍ୟା ମନ୍ଦିର,ଖଲଣା)
 St Xavier's High school

Religion and Culture 
Pana Sankranti (ପଣା ସଂକ୍ରାନ୍ତି) is the major local festival of the village and among other things, this festival is famous for chaiti parba (ଚଇତି ପର୍ବ).

Other local festivals include: Raja, Holi, Ratha-Yatra, Rama Nabami Janmastami, Lakshmi Puja, Nila Madhab and Narayan Medha.

Holy places 

 Bada Gadia pond

 Kuni Baba Matha (Hindu monastery) 10 temples are built there.

 Hanuman Statue–statue of Lord Hanuman near Patana Gadia

References

External links 

Cities and towns in Kendujhar district
Villages in Kendujhar district